Modder River ("modder" is Afrikaans for "mud") is an irrigation and stock farming town situated south of Kimberley near the confluence of the Riet and Modder rivers in the Northern Cape province of South Africa.

The Second Boer War Battle of Modder River took place here.

References

Populated places in the Sol Plaatje Local Municipality